Imperfectum (Latin "unfinished" or "incomplete") may mean:
 Imperfect, a verb form
 Opus Imperfectum, an early Christian commentary on the Gospel of Matthew
 in the Middle Age theory of music
 for tempi - tempus imperfectum and tempus imperfectum diminutum - see Mensural notation 
 for consonances see Consonance and dissonance#Antiquity and the middle ages